Tuzkuyusu is a village in the Siirt District of Siirt Province in Turkey. The village had a population of 548 in 2021.

The hamlets of Çevre, Ekinli and Yurt are attached to the village.

References 

Villages in Siirt District
Kurdish settlements in Siirt Province